Fine’sa Grupa Ltd. is a company for finance management, investment, real estate and ecoenergy. Other operations also include structuring investments for  maintenance and increase of project's value. The company’s headquarters is in Varaždin, Croatia but there are also two remote companies in Donje Ladanje (Fine'sa Consors)  and Zadar (Fine'sa Cordis).

History

Chronology of completed projects:
 1975. – Ivančica Plc., footwear factory, Ivanec
 1988. – Mipcro Ltd., construction, Ivanec
 1991. – Savings and credit cooperatives Mipcro, Ivanec
 1995. – Consors Ltd., footwear, Donje Ladanje
 1997. – Savings and credit cooperatives Kovanica, Varaždin
 1998. – Kajzerica Ltd., bakery, Ivanec
 2002. – Banka Kovanica Plc., finance, Varaždin

Chronology of current projects:
 2006. – Fine’sa Cordis Ltd., fishing, Zadar
 2007. – Fine’sa Conceptus Ltd., investments, Varaždin
 2007. – Fine’sa Credos Plc.,finance, Varaždin
 2010. – Conceptus Publica Ltd., publishing, Varaždin
 2011. – Conceptus Electrica Ltd., energy, Varaždin
 2012. – Fine’sa Grupa Ltd., consulting, Varaždin
 2014. – Fine’sa Confidus Ltd., factoring, Varaždin

Fine'sa Grupa today 
Fine’sa Grupa Ltd. includes the following companies:
 Fine’sa Credos Plc., financial company
 Fine’sa Conceptus Ltd., investment company
  Conceptus Publica Ltd.  - Media
  Conceptus Electrica Ltd - Ecoenergy
 Fine’sa Cordis Ltd., fishing company
 Fine’sa Consors Ltd., footwear company

Fine’sa Credos Plc., financial company 
Fine´sa Credos Plc. is a finance company of development, project management of savings and commercial financing.

Fine’sa Conceptus Ltd., investment company 
Fine´sa Conceptus is an investment company for investment, development and management of investment and property projects and ecoenergy. This is a minor partner investments in proven and know projects, which typically sell their products and services to the operated state companies, national companies, public sector or companies with market image and financial rating, or appropriate guarantees.

Fine’sa Cordis Ltd., fishing company 
Fine´sa Cordis is a fishing company of development and business management of the catch, processing and trade in fish. The company was founded in 2006. under the name Dalmacija ribolov d.o.o., to catch pelagic fish with a fleet of three ships. Today the company operates in the system Fine´sa Grupa with a capital of 22.058.593 kunas, 30 employees in the catch and up to 60 in processing management with a defined development strategy in period from 2016. to 2018. in terms of the partnership to increase the fishing fleet.

Fine’sa Consors Ltd., footwear company 
Fine´sa Consors is a footwear company of development and business management of production and trade of footwear, employs 250 people (not counting employees in corporation), with annual production of 300,000 pairs of high-quality waterproof footwear, specially made for mountaineering, trekking and leisure. The company was founded in 1995 and is headquartered in Donje Ladanje, Croatia.

References

External links
 
 http://www.strukturnifondovi.hr/
 http://emedjimurje.rtl.hr/gospodarstvo/
 http://www.najnovijevijesti.net

Financial services companies of Croatia
Financial services companies established in 2012
2012 establishments in Croatia